Leitrim may refer to:

Places

Canada
 Leitrim, Ontario, a residential neighbourhood near Ottawa
 CFS Leitrim, a Canadian military base located in the same neighbourhood

Ireland
 County Leitrim
 Leitrim, County Leitrim, a village in County Leitrim
 Leitrim (County Leitrim barony), a barony in County Leitrim
 Leitrim (Counties Galway and Clare barony), a barony mainly in County Galway and partly in County Clare
 Leitrim Station, a former railway station on the defunct Cavan & Leitrim Railway

Northern Ireland
 Leitrim, County Antrim, a townland in County Antrim, Northern Ireland
 Leitrim, County Down, a small village in County Down, Northern Ireland
 Leitrim, County Fermanagh, a townland in County Fermanagh, Northern Ireland
 Leitrim, County Londonderry, a townland in County Londonderry, Northern Ireland
 Leitrim, County Tyrone, a townland in County Tyrone, Northern Ireland

Sport

Gaelic games
 Leitrim GAA, one of the 32 Gaelic Athletic Association counties.

Constituencies

Before 1801
Leitrim (Parliament of Ireland constituency)

1801–1885
Leitrim (UK Parliament constituency)

1885–1918
North Leitrim (UK Parliament constituency)
South Leitrim (UK Parliament constituency)

1918–1921
Leitrim (UK Parliament constituency)

1921–1923
Leitrim–Roscommon North (Dáil constituency)

1923–1937
Leitrim–Sligo (Dáil constituency)

1937–1948
Leitrim (Dáil constituency)

1948–1969
Sligo–Leitrim (Dáil constituency)

1969–1977
Donegal–Leitrim (Dáil constituency)
Roscommon–Leitrim (Dáil constituency)
Sligo–Leitrim (Dáil constituency)

1977–1981
Roscommon–Leitrim (Dáil constituency)
Sligo–Leitrim (Dáil constituency)

1981–2007, 2016–present
Sligo–Leitrim (Dáil constituency)

2007–2016
Roscommon–South Leitrim (Dáil constituency)
Sligo–North Leitrim (Dáil constituency)